Anne May (born 11 November 1961) is a German literary scholar and librarian.

Life 
May grew up in Damme, Lower Saxony, studied at University of Osnabrück in literature and educational sciences, and then worked for a year in a small bookstore in Damme. After that, she became a librarian and completed her traineeship, first at the University Library Oldenburg, where she created its first website and an online catalog, and then from 1992 to 1993 at the Niedersächsische Landesbibliothek Hannover.

From 2002 to 2015, May worked as deputy director of the Technical Information Library and Hannover University Library (TIB/UB), and in January 2106 succeeded  as director of the Gottfried Wilhelm Leibniz Library.

May is married, has a daughter, and lives in a village near Seelze.

Notes

1961 births
Living people
Literary scholars
German librarians
German women librarians